

Champions

Major League Baseball
World Series: St. Louis Cardinals over Boston Red Sox (4–3)
All-Star Game, July 9 at Fenway Park: American League, 12–0

Other champions
All-American Girls Professional Baseball League: Racine Belles
Japanese Baseball League: Great Ring
Negro League World Series: Newark Eagles over Kansas City Monarchs (4–3)
Negro League Baseball All-Star Game: East, 5–3 (first game, at Griffith Stadium); West, 4–1 (second game, at Comiskey Park)
Winter Leagues
Cuban League: Elefantes de Cienfuegos
Mexican Pacific League: Venados de Mazatlán
Puerto Rican League: Senadores de San Juan
Venezuelan League: Sabios de Vargas

Awards and honors
Baseball Hall of Fame
Jesse Burkett
Frank Chance
Jack Chesbro
Johnny Evers
Clark Griffith
Tommy McCarthy
Joe McGinnity
Eddie Plank
Joe Tinker
Rube Waddell
Ed Walsh
Most Valuable Player
Ted Williams (AL) – OF, Boston Red Sox
Stan Musial (NL) – 1B, St. Louis Cardinals
The Sporting News Player of the Year Award
Stan Musial (NL) – 1B, St. Louis Cardinals
The Sporting News Manager of the Year Award
Eddie Dyer (NL) – St. Louis Cardinals
The Sporting News Rookie of the Year Award
Del Ennis (Philadelphia NL, OF)

MLB statistical leaders

Major league baseball final standings

American League final standings

National League final standings

Negro league baseball final standings

Negro American League final standings

Negro National League final standings

Japanese Baseball League final standings

Events

January
January 3 - The Boston Red Sox get slugger Rudy York from Detroit for shortstop Eddie Lake.
January 12 – Boston Red Sox star Ted Williams receives his discharge from the U.S. Marine Air Corps after a three-year stint serving in World War II. In spite of the long absence from competitive baseball, Williams will return to the major leagues by hitting .342 with 38 home runs and 123 RBI in 1946.
January 12 – The first official professional game is played in Venezuela, launching the newly constituted four-team . The league is composed of four teams: Caracas BBC, Magallanes BBC, Vargas BBC and Venezuela BBC. The inaugural game is won by Magallanes over Venezuela, 5–2, behind strong pitching from Alex Carrasquel, who gives up 11 hits in a complete game effort.
January 20 – In a classic pitching matchup played in Caracas, Venezuela, Alex Carrasquel of Magallanes beat Roy Welmaker and Vargas club, 3–2, in 17 innings. In the six-and-a-half-hour marathon, Carrasquel is good enough to silence the bats of Roy Campanella and Sam Jethroe. Both pitchers go the distance in one of the greatest matchups ever.

February
February 19 –  New York Giants OF Danny Gardella becomes the first major leaguer to announce he is jumping to the "outlaw" Mexican League, the first shot in the series of events that will dominate baseball even more than the return of all the war veterans. His attempt to return to Major League Baseball a few years later will initiate a major court battle.

March
March 7 – Negro leaguer Marvin Williams, playing for the Sabios de Vargas against the Navegantes del Magallanes, sets a still-standing Venezuelan League mark by driving in eight runs on two home runs and two singles, while leading Vargas to a 16–9 victory.

April
April 18 – Jackie Robinson, signed to the Brooklyn Dodgers organization by owner Branch Rickey, makes his first appearance with the Montreal Royals in the International League.
April 23 – Ed Head pitches a no-hitter as the Brooklyn Dodgers blank the Boston Braves, 5-0.
April 30 – Bob Feller tosses the second no-hitter of his career in a 1-0 Cleveland Indians win over the New York Yankees.

May

June
 June 7 — The Pittsburgh Pirates' 36 active players vote 20–16 to authorize a strike rather than take the field against the New York Giants after club president William Benswanger refuses to negotiate with the American Baseball Guild, a nascent trade union. With player rosters expanded to 36 men (through June 15) because of the return of World War II veterans to their former teams, the union required a two-thirds vote (24 players) to legally authorize a job action. Thus the strike vote lost, dealing a lethal blow to the Guild. Later in 1946, owners offered minor concessions to players and effectively staved off the creation of a union until 1966.
June 24 – A bus carrying the Spokane Indians Minor League Baseball team crashed on Snoqualmie Pass in Washington State in the worst accident in the history of all of U.S. professional sports, as of October 2007. Nine members of the 16-member team were killed and six were injured. Eight of those who died served in World War II.

July
July 9 – At Fenway Park, home of the Boston Red Sox, the American League crushes the National League, 12–0, in the All-Star Game.
July 14 – Player-manager Lou Boudreau of the Cleveland Indians hits four doubles and one home run, but Ted Williams wallops three homers and drives in eight runs, as the Boston Red Sox top the Indians, 11–10. In the Sox second-game win, the famous Boudreau Shift is born. Boudreau shifts all his players, except the third baseman and left fielder, to the right side of the diamond in an effort to stop Williams. Ted grounds out and walks twice while ignoring the shift.
July 19 – Fourteen Chicago White Sox players are ejected from the game against the Boston Red Sox, leaving only the manager and coaches and the nine players on the field in the dugout.

August
August 4 – St. Louis Browns relief pitcher Tom Ferrick earns the win in both games of a doubleheader with the Philadelphia Athletics.
August 9 – All games (four each for both the American and National Leagues) were played at night for the first time in Major League history.
September 13 – The Boston Red Sox clinch the American League pennant, edging the Cleveland Indians, 1–0, at Cleveland's League Park II on Ted Williams' inside-the-park home run, the only one of his career. Williams punches the ball over the shift when Cleveland left fielder Pat Seerey pulls in behind the shortstop position. It is Boston's first pennant since .

September

October
October 1 – October 3 – After finishing the regular season tied for first place, the St. Louis Cardinals and the Brooklyn Dodgers met in the first-ever National League playoff series.  The Cardinals win the best-of-three series, two games to none, and advance to the World Series.
October 15 – The St. Louis Cardinals defeat the Boston Red Sox, 4-3, in Game 7 of the World Series to win their sixth World Series, four games to three.  The Red Sox would not appear in the World Series for another 21 years, which, coincidentally, would be a rematch with the Cardinals.

November

December

Births

January
January 2 – Sonny Ruberto
January 3 – Archie Reynolds
January 7 – Joe Keough
January 10 – Vern Geishert
January 10 – George Korince
January 15 – Tom Robson
January 18 – Billy Grabarkewitz
January 21 – Johnny Oates
January 29 – Tony Pierce

February
February 5 – Vic Correll
February 5 – Norm Miller
February 8 – Oscar Brown
February 8 – Larry Burchart
February 10 – Bob Spence
February 23 – Ken Boswell
February 28 – Marty Perez

March
March 4 – Danny Frisella
March 5 – Les Rohr
March 14 – Ron Law
March 15 – Bobby Bonds
March 18 – Van Kelly
March 21 – Rickey Clark
March 21 – Al Fitzmorris
March 27 – Mike Jackson
March 27 – Bill Sudakis
March 31 – Bill Denehy
March 31 – Gonzalo Márquez

April
April 3 – Rod Gaspar
April 8 – Catfish Hunter
April 9 – Nate Colbert
April 10 – Phil Hennigan
April 10 – Leroy Stanton
April 10 – Bob Watson
April 16 – Sergio Robles
April 18 – Gerry Janeski
April 20 – Chuck Machemehl
April 20 – Tom Hutton
April 29 – Don Buschhorn

May
May 10 – Miguel Fuentes
May 10 – Ray Jarvis
May 17 – Dan Monzon
May 18 – Reggie Jackson
May 20 – Jim Lyttle
May 20 – Bobby Murcer
May 22 – Jim Colborn
May 22 – Dave Robinson
May 24 – Ellie Rodriguez
May 25 – Mike Corkins
May 28 – Skip Jutze
May 29 – Dyar Miller
May 30 – Mike Sadek

June
June 2 – Roger Freed
June 6 – Gaylen Pitts
June 8 – Jack Lind
June 9 – Tom Egan
June 11 – Danny Morris
June 12 – Jim Strickland
June 15 – Ken Henderson
June 15 – Champ Summers
June 16 – Tom Ragland
June 19 – Ozzie Osborn
June 28 – Greg Sims

July
July 4 – Joe Henderson
July 7 – Rick Kester
July 9 – George Stone
July 13 – Jerry Terrell
July 15 – Ron Diorio
July 20 – John Lamb
July 22 – Bill Zepp
July 27 – Larry Biittner
July 29 – Harvey Shank

August
August 4 – Kevin Collins
August 9 – Jerry Moses
August 11 – Mike Hedlund
August 11 – Eddie Leon
August 15 – Joe Lis
August 15 – Ernie McAnally
August 17 – Skip Lockwood
August 18 – Derryl Cousins
August 18 – Jim Magnuson
August 22 – Gary Boyd
August 25 – Rollie Fingers
August 27 – Ed Herrmann
August 27 – Ray Peters
August 28 – Mike Torrez
August 29 – Bill McNulty
August 29 – John Sipin

September
September 1 – Monty Montgomery
September 4 – Sal Artiaga
September 4 – Ken Wright
September 6 – Fran Healy
September 7 – Willie Crawford
September 7 – Joe Rudi
September 8 – Ken Forsch
September 8 – Jeff Pentland
September 18 – Dave Sells
September 19 – Joe Ferguson
September 19 – Ron Lolich
September 20 – Roric Harrison
September 22 – Larry Dierker
September 24 – Lou Camilli
September 24 – Kōichi Tabuchi

October
October 1 – Jon Warden
October 2 – Bob Robertson
October 6 – Gene Clines
October 6 – Gary Gentry
October 8 – Ralph Gagliano
October 8 – Paul Splittorff
October 8 – Mike Wegener
October 9 – Jim Qualls
October 10 – Gene Tenace
October 11 – Jarvis Tatum
October 13 – John Strohmayer
October 14 – Frank Duffy
October 14 – Al Oliver
October 15 – Scott Northey
October 17 – Rich Folkers
October 18 – George Greer
October 19 – Warren Bogle
October 25 – Don Eddy
October 25 – Koji Yamamoto
October 27 – Rick Austin
October 29 – Frank Baker

November
November 1 – Dick Baney
November 1 – Jim Kennedy
November 2 – Tom Paciorek
November 3 – Tom Heintzelman
November 3 – Garry Hill
November 4 – Danny Godby
November 5 – Jim Bethke
November 5 – Jim Evans
November 13 – George Theodore
November 22 – Cy Acosta
November 22 – Rich McKinney
November 25 – Wenty Ford
November 25 – Don Leshnock

December
December 2 – Pedro Borbón
December 3 – Greg Washburn
December 8 – Alan Foster
December 9 – Rick Bladt
December 10 – Bobby Fenwick
December 15 – Art Howe
December 17 – Michiyo Arito
December 25 – Gene Lamont
December 28 – Spaceman Bill Lee
December 29 – Ken Rudolph

Deaths

January
January 13 – Kid Speer, 59, Canadian pitcher who played for the Detroit Tigers during the 1909 season.
January 18 – Dave Wright, 70, pitcher who played with the Pittsburgh Pirates in 1895 and the Chicago Colts in 1897.
January 13 – Reeve McKay, 64, pitcher who played briefly for the 1915 St. Louis Browns of the American League.
January 23 – William Matthews, 68, pitcher for the 1909 Boston Red Sox.
January 28 – Pat Flaherty, 79, third baseman who played for the 1894 Louisville Colonels of the National League.
January 29 – Ed Merrill, 85, second baseman for the Louisville Eclipse, Worcester Ruby Legs and Indianapolis Hoosiers in span of two seasons from 1882–1884.

February
February 1 – Dad Hale, 65, pitched 11 games for the Boston Beaneaters and Baltimore Orioles in 1902.
February 6 – Charlie Knepper, 74, pitcher for the 1899 Cleveland Spiders of the National League.
February 13 – Marc Campbell, 61, shortstop in two games for the 1907 Pittsburgh Pirates.
February 14 – Woody Wagenhorst, 82, third baseman in two games for the 1888 Philadelphia Quakers of the National League who later became head coach of the University of Pennsylvania football team from 1888–1891.
February 15 – George Starnagle, 72, played one game at catcher for the Cleveland Bronchos in the 1902 season.
February 21 – Bill Cunningham, 59, second baseman for the Washington Senators from 1910-12.

March
March 3 – Hick Cady, 60, backup catcher for the Boston Red Sox from 1912 to 1917 and the Philadelphia Phillies in 1919.
March 6 – Claude Thomas, 55, pitched briefly for the Washington Senators in the 1916 season.
March 9 – Tom Nagle, 80, catcher for the Chicago Colts of the National League for parts of two seasons from 1890 to 1891.
March 11 – Ed McDonald, 59, third baseman for parts of three seasons with the Boston Rustlers/Braves and Chicago Cubs from 1911 to 1913.
March 16 – John Kerin, 71, American League umpire who officiated from 1908 to 1910.
March 21 – George Wheeler, 76, switch pitcher for the Philadelphia Phillies from 1896-99.
March 25 – Hack Schumann, 61, pitched briefly for the 1906 Philadelphia Athletics.
March 28 – Chick Fullis, 42, center fielder who played from 1928 to 1936 for the New York Giants, Philadelphia Phillies and St. Louis Cardinals, and a member of the 1934 World Champions Cardinals.
March 28 – Cumberland Posey, 55, Hall of Fame outfielder, manager, executive, and  the principal owner of the Homestead Grays, who built a strong barnstorming circuit that made the Grays a perennially powerful and profitable team, one of the best in Negro leagues history.

April
April 1 – George Strief, 89, utility man who played all infield and outfield positions for several clubs between 1879 and 1885.
April 4 – Harry Cross, 64, one of the most accomplished sports journalists in New York City for more than three decades.
April 5 – Wally Rehg, 57, right fielder for the Boston Red Sox, Boston Braves and Cincinnati Reds between 1912 and 1919, later a minor league player and manager from 1910 to 1930
April 13 – Billy Gumbert, 80, pitcher who played for the Pittsburgh Alleghenys/Pirates and Louisville Colonels in part of three seasons spanning 1890–1893.
April 15 – Pete Allen, 77, backup catcher for the Cleveland Spiders in the 1893 season.
April 17 – John Picus "Jack" Quinn, 62, Slovakia-born pitcher who won 247 games with eight different teams from 1909 to 1933, winning his last game when he was 50 years old; setting a record as the oldest Major League pitcher to win a game until Jamie Moyer broke it on April 17, 2012.
April 24 – Joe Birmingham, 61, center fielder and manager for the Cleveland Naps in the early 1900s.

May
May 6 – Bill Deitrick, 44, outfielder and shortstop for the Philadelphia Phillies in 1927 and 1928.
May 7 – Bill Fincher, 51, pitcher for the 1916 St. Louis Browns of the American League.
May 7 – Bill Fox, 74, second baseman for the Washington Senators in 1897 and the Cincinnati Reds in 1901, who also spent 13 seasons in the Minor Leagues as a player/manager between 1894 and 1915.
May 10 – Harry Swan, 58, who made one pitching appearance for the  Kansas City Packers of the Federal League in 1914.
May 15 – Ed Mayer, 80, third baseman in 188 games for the Philadelphia Phillies from 1890 to 1891.
May 19 – John K. Tener, 82, Irish pitcher and outfielder who played from 1888 through 1890 for the 	Baltimore Orioles, Chicago White Stockings, and Pittsburgh Burghers before becoming president of the National League from 1913 to 1918.
May 22 – Harry Betts, 64, who pitched one game in 1903 with the St. Louis Cardinals, and then came back to the majors ten years later in 1913 to pitch one more game for the Cincinnati Reds in 1913.
May 23 – Johnny Grabowski, 46, catcher who played for three teams in a span of seven seasons from 1924–1931, and a member of the Murderers' Row New York Yankees clubs that clinched the World Series in 1927 and 1928.
May 30 – Billy Earle, 78, catcher for five major league teams in five seasons from 1889–1894, who continued playing and managing in the minors until 1906, and also managed the Almendares BBC in 1901 to become the first American manager in Cuban Winter League history.

June
June 2 – Malcolm MacDonald, 74, outfielder for the New York Giants in 1902.
June 4 – Tom Barry, 67,  pitcher for the 1904 Philadelphia Phillies.
June 17 – James Isaminger, 65, sportswriter for Philadelphia newspapers from 1905 to 1940, who played a major role in breaking the story of the Black Sox Scandal.
June 26 – Chris Hartje, 31, catcher who played with the Brooklyn Dodgers in the 1939 season; Hartje was one of nine members of the Spokane Indians of the Class B Western International League who died as the result of a June 24, 1946, bus crash on the Snoqualmie Pass Highway in the Cascade Mountains, the worst transit accident in baseball history.
June 30 – Sam Hope, 67, pitcher for the 1907 Philadelphia Athletics.

July
July 1 – Hub Knolls, 62, pitched two games for the 1906 Brooklyn Superbas.
July 17 – John Fluhrer, 52, played briefly in left field for the Chicago Cubs during the 1915 season.
July 17 – Tom Forster, 87, second baseman for the 1882 Detroit Wolverines and from 1884-86 for the Pittsburgh Alleghenys and New York Metropolitans of the American Association.
July 18 – James Lehan, 90, played briefly in the outfield for the 1884 Washington Nationals of the Union Association.
July 22 – Elmer Foster, 84, outfielder for all or parts of five seasons for the New York Metropolitans of the American Association, and the New York Giants and Chicago Cubs of the National League between 1886 and 1891, including the 1888 Giants National League Championship team.

August
August 1 – Bert Sincock, 58, pitched one game for the 1908 Cincinnati Reds.
August 2 – Carl Lind, 42, second baseman from 1927 to 1930 for the Cleveland Indians who led the American League in at-bats in 1928 (659).
August 6 – Tony Lazzeri, 42, Hall of Fame and All-Star second baseman for the New York Yankees, who won six American League pennants from 1926 through 1937, while batting .300 five times and collecting seven 100-RBI seasons, including two grand slams and 11 RBI in a 1936 game, and a .400 average in the 1937 World Series.
August 7 – Tad Quinn, 64, played parts of two seasons on the mound for the Philadelphia Athletics from 1902 to 1903.
August 16 – Billy Rhiel, 46, infielder for the Brooklyn Robins, Boston Braves, and Detroit Tigers from 1929 to 1933.
August 19 – Bob McKinney, 70, played briefly in the infield for the 1901 Philadelphia Athletics.

September
September 11 – Cy Morgan, 50, pitcher for parts of two seasons for the Boston Braves in 1921-22.
September 13 – Ed Gagnier, 64, French shortstop who played in the Federal League for the Brooklyn Tip-Tops and Buffalo Blues from 1914 to 1915.
September 15 – Tex Wilson, 45, pitched two games for the 1924 Brooklyn Robins.
September 16 – Emil Bildilli, 34, southpaw pitcher for five seasons for the St. Louis Browns from 1937–1941.
September 17 – Frank Burke, 66, played parts of two seasons at outfielder for the 1906 New York Giants and the 1907 Boston Doves of the National League.
September 17 – Chief Chouneau, 57, Chippewa pitcher who played in one game for the Chicago White Sox in 1910.
September 20 – Wiley Piatt, 72, pitcher for six seasons from 1898–1903 for the Philadelphia Phillies, Philadelphia Athletics, Chicago White Sox, and Boston Beaneaters, who holds the dubious distinction of being the only pitcher in the 20th century to hurl  two complete games in a single day and lose them both.
September 24 – Jeff Tesreau, 58, spitball ace for the New York Giants from 1912 to 1918 who won three pennants with them (1912, 1913, and 1917), and led the National League in ERA in 1912 and shutouts in 1914, ending his career with a 115-72 record, 2.43 ERA, and 880 strikeouts.
September 27 – Benjamin Minor, 81, co-owner or owner of the Washington Senators from 1904 to 1919.
September 27 – Eddie Tiemeyer, 61, infielder/pitcher during three seasons with the Cincinnati Reds and New York Highlanders spanning 1906 to 1909.

October
October 4 – John Woods, 48, pitched one game for the 1924 Boston Red Sox.
October 10 – Walter Clarkson, 67, pitcher in five seasons with the New York Highlanders and Cleveland Naps from 1904 to 1908.
October 10 – Bill Jones, 59, outfielder who played two seasons with the Boston Rustlers/Braves in 1911-12.
October 18 – Jack McCallister, 67, minor league player who became a major league manager and coach; piloted 1927 Cleveland Indians to a 66–87 record, good for sixth in the American League.

November
November 3 – Ben Taylor, 57, pitcher for the 1912 Cincinnati Reds.
November 4 – John Barthold, 64, pitcher who played for the Philadelphia Athletics during the 1904 season.
November 5 – Alejandro Oms, 51, Cuban center fielder who played in the Negro leagues.
November 7 – Tom Daly, 54, Canadian catcher for the Chicago White Sox, Cleveland Indians and Chicago Cubs during eight seasons spanning 1913–1921, who later managed the Toronto Maple Leafs of the International League, and coached for the Boston Red Sox in 14 seasons (1933–1946), to set the longest consecutive-year coaching tenure in Bosox history.
November 11 – Art Reinhart, 47, pitcher who played for the St. Louis Cardinals in a span of five seasons from 1919 to 1928.
November 18 – Johnny Lush, 61, pitcher for the Philadelphia Phillies and St. Louis Cardinals from 1904 through 1910, who no-hit the Brooklyn Superbas in 1906, which was the last no-hitter by a Phillies pitcher in 57 years until Jim Bunning hurled a perfect game in 1964.
November 27 – Arlie Tarbert, 42, reserve outfielder for the 1927–1928 Boston Red Sox.
November 28 – Bill DeLancey, 35, catcher for the Gashouse Gang 1934 St. Louis Cardinals, whose promising career was cut short by tuberculosis.
November 30 – Pete McShannic, 82, third baseman for the Pittsburgh Alleghenys of the National League in the 1888 season.

December
December 10 – Walter Johnson, 59, Hall of Fame pitcher who played from 1907 through 1927 for the Washington Senators, whose 417 career victories ranks second to the 511 achieved by Cy Young, while setting an all-time record with 110 shutouts, and collecting 3,509 strikeouts, twelve 20-win seasons, including two 30-win seasons, as well as eleven seasons with an earned run average below 2.00, 5,914 innings pitched, and 531 complete games in 666 starts.
December 10 – Walter Moser, 65, pitcher for the Philadelphia Athletics, Boston Red Sox and St. Louis Browns in a span of three seasons from 1906–1911.
December 10 – Damon Runyon, 62, famed New York sportswriter and author.
December 14 – Tom Dowse, 80, Irish catcher/outfielder who played in the 1890s for the Cleveland Spiders/Solons, Louisville Colonels, Cincinnati Reds, Philadelphia Phillies and Washington Senators.
December 21 – Bill Evans, 53, pitcher for the Pittsburgh Pirates in three seasons from 1916–1919.
December 30 – Pat McGehee, 58, pitcher who played for the 1912 Detroit Tigers.

References

External links

Baseball Reference – 1946 MLB Season Summary  
Baseball Reference – MLB Players born in 1946
Baseball Reference – MLB Players died in 1946